Iceland is an island country at the confluence of the North Atlantic and Arctic oceans, east of Greenland and immediately south of the Arctic Circle, atop the constructive boundary of the northern Mid-Atlantic Ridge. The island country is the world's 18th largest in area and one of the most sparsely populated. It is the westernmost European country when not including Greenland and has more land covered by glaciers than continental Europe.

Statistics 

Iceland is an island country in Northern Europe, straddling the Eurasian and North American plates between the Greenland Sea and the North Atlantic Ocean, northwest of the British Isles.

Extent (locations outside mainland in parentheses)
North: Rifstangi, 66°32′3" N (Kolbeinsey, 67°08,9 N)
South: Kötlutangi, 63°23′6" N (Surtsey, 63°17,7 N)
West: Bjargtangar, 24°32′1" W
East: Gerpir, 13°29′6" W (Hvalbakur, 13°16,6 W)

Area: 
Total: 
Land: 100,329 km²
Water: 2,796 km²
 Coastline Iceland has a coastline of 4,970 km.

Maritime claims: 
Territorial sea: 
Exclusive economic zone:  with 
Continental shelf:  or to the edge of the continental margin

Elevation extremes: 
Lowest point: Atlantic Ocean 0 m
Highest point: Hvannadalshnúkur 2,110 m

Natural resources:
Marine life, diatomite, hydropower, geothermal power

Land use 
Arable land: 1.21%
Permanent crops: 0%
Other: 98.79% (2012)
 Total renewable water resources
 170 km3 (2011)
 Freshwater withdrawal (domestic/industrial/agricultural)
Total: 0.17 km3/yr (49%/8%/42%)
Per capita: 539.2 m3/yr (2005)
 Natural hazards
Volcanism, earthquakes, avalanches, and glacial lake outburst flooding (or jökulhlaups)
 Environment—current issues
Water pollution from fertilizer runoff; inadequate wastewater treatment

Physical geography 
Iceland consists of eight geographical regions, Capital Region, Southern Peninsula, West, Westfjords, Northwest, Northeast, East and South. Twenty percent of the land is used for grazing, while only one percent is cultivated. Iceland has lost most of the woodland that previously covered large areas of the country, but an ambitious reforestation program is currently underway. Fossilized tree pollen and descriptions by the early settlers indicate that prior to human settlement, now thought to have occurred from around AD 800 onwards, trees covered between thirty and forty per cent of the island. Today, however, there are only small patches of the original birch forests left, the most prominent being Hallormsstaðaskógur and Vaglaskógur. The country of Iceland contains 36 islands. Iceland has three national parks: Vatnajökull National Park, Snæfellsjökull National Park, and Þingvellir National Park. The inhabited areas are on the coast, particularly in the southwest, while the central highlands are all but uninhabited. The island's terrain is mostly plateau interspersed with mountain peaks, icefields and a coast deeply indented by bays and fjords.

Highlands 

The area is mostly uninhabited and uninhabitable.

Westfjords 
The Westfjords region is composed of a large, mountainous peninsula on Iceland's northwestern coast. The coastline is marked by numerous fjords as its name suggests. The peninsula contains Iceland's northernmost glacier, Drangajökull.

Southern Peninsula 
The Southern Peninsula, also known as the Reykjanes Peninsula, is located in the southwestern corner of Iceland. The area contains little vegetation because of active volcanism and large lava fields. There are hot springs and sulphur springs in the southern portion of the peninsula, in the Kleifarvatn lake and the Krýsuvík geothermal area.

Capital Region 
Home to Iceland's capital, Reykjavík, the Capital Region is the most densely populated area in Iceland. It is located on the southwest coast of the island near the Southern Peninsula. The majority of Reykjavik is located on the Seltjarnarnes peninsula. Mount Esja, at 914 metres (2,999 ft), is the highest mountain in the vicinity of Reykjavík. Several natural harbours exist and provide good fishing grounds.

West 
Located in the western portion of the island and north of the Capital Region. In Hvalfjörður fjord rests the second-tallest waterfall in Iceland, Glymur. West is also home to Borgarfjörður, a fjord with volcanic activity such as Deildartunguhver- a powerful hotspring. The  Hafnarfjall Mountain rises over the landscape.

South 
The southern portion of Iceland contains some of its most notable volcanoes such as Hekla, Eldgjá, and Katla. Alongside the volcanoes exist numerous glaciers such as Vatnajökull, Mýrdalsjökull, and Eyjafjallajökull. Basalt columns and black sand beaches are examples of the volcanic activity of the area. The area also contains mountain ranges and Iceland's highest peak, Hvannadalshnjúkur, as well as the Vestmannaeyjar (Westman Islands) archipelago.

East 
East Iceland contains the majority of the island's vegetation and birch forests.

Glaciers 

Around 10.2 per cent of the total land area is covered by glaciers, although these are retreating at an accelerating rate. The four largest Icelandic glaciers are:

Hofsjökull (827 km2)
Langjökull (868 km2)
Mýrdalsjökull (542 km2)
Vatnajökull (7,764 km2)

Other notable glaciers include:

Drangajökull (145 km2)
Eiríksjökull (21 km2)
Eyjafjallajökull (70 km2)
Snæfellsjökull (10 km2).
Tindfjallajökull (11 km2)
Torfajökull (10 km2)
Tungnafellsjökull (33 km2)
Þórisjökull (25 km2)
Þrándarjökull (16 km2)

Climate 

Because of the moderating influence of the North Atlantic Current, the climate is temperate and characterized by damp, cool summers and relatively mild but windy winters.

Geology

Iceland has extensive volcanic and geothermal activity. The rift associated with the Mid-Atlantic Ridge, which marks the division between the Eurasian Plate and North American tectonic plates, runs across Iceland from the southwest to the northeast. This geographic feature is prominent at the Þingvellir National Park, where the promontory creates an extraordinary natural amphitheatre. The site was the home of Iceland's parliament, the Alþing, which was first convened in 930. It is a common misconception that Þingvellir is at the juncture between the North American and Eurasian continental plates. However, they are in fact at the juncture of the North American continental plate and a smaller plate (approx. 10,000 km2) called the Hreppar Microplate (Hreppaflekinn). From 1963 to 1967, the island of Surtsey was created on the southwest coast by a volcanic eruption.

Geological activity

A geologically young land, Iceland is located on both the Iceland hotspot and the Mid-Atlantic Ridge, which runs right through it. This location means that the island is highly geologically active with earthquakes and volcanoes, notably Hekla, Eldgjá, Herðubreið and Eldfell. Eyjafjallajökull (1,666 m) erupted in 2010, disrupting European air traffic. To demonstrate the geothermal activity, the Icelandic Meteorological Office said that during a single week in February 2021, around 17,000 earthquakes have hit the southwestern region of Reykjanes.

Iceland has many geysers, including Geysir, from which the English word geyser is derived. With the widespread availability of geothermal power, and the harnessing of many rivers and waterfalls for hydroelectricity, most residents have access to inexpensive hot water, heating, and electricity. The island is composed primarily of basalt, a low-silica lava associated with effusive volcanism as has occurred also in Hawaii. Iceland, however, has a variety of volcanic types (composite and fissure), many producing more evolved lavas such as rhyolite and andesite. Iceland has hundreds of volcanoes, with approximately 30 active volcanic systems.

Environment—international agreements 
Party to:

Air Pollution, Air Pollution-Persistent Organic Pollutants, Biodiversity, Climate Change, Desertification, Endangered Species, Hazardous Wastes, Law of the Sea, Marine Dumping, Nuclear Test Ban, Ozone Layer Protection, Ship Pollution (MARPOL 73/78), Wetlands, Whaling

Signed, but not ratified:

Environmental Modification, Marine Life Conservation

Images

Maps

See also

 Extreme points of Europe
 Highlands of Iceland
 Iceland hotspot
 Iceland plume
 List of earthquakes in Iceland
 List of extreme points of Iceland
 List of fjords of Iceland
 List of islands of Iceland
 List of lakes of Iceland
 List of national parks of Iceland
 List of rivers of Iceland
 List of valleys of Iceland
 List of waterfalls of Iceland

References

External links
Iceland at the CIA World Factbook